Darma may refer to:
Darma, Nepal, a rural municipality in Salyan district, Nepal
Darma Valley in Uttarakhand, India
Darma River, which forms the valley
Darmiya language, a Sino-Tibetan language spoken in India
Darma, a character in the 2018 animated film Suicide Squad: Hell to Pay
Darma, a character in the 2016 animated film Rock Dog

See also 

 Drama (disambiguation)